Matthew Whitaker Ransom (October 8, 1826October 8, 1904) was a general in the Confederate States Army during the American Civil War and a Democratic U.S. senator from the state of North Carolina between 1872 and 1895.

Early life and antebellum career
Matt Ransom was born in Warren County, North Carolina, to Robert and Priscilla Whitaker Ransom. He was the elder brother of General Robert Ransom, a cousin to fellow Confederate officer Wharton J. Green, who served as a U. S. Congressman after the Civil War, and a cousin to physician and aviation pioneer William Whitney Christmas. Matt Ransom graduated from the University of North Carolina in 1847, where he was a member of the Philanthropic Society.

On January 19, 1853, Ransom married Martha Anne "Pattie" Exum of Northampton County, North Carolina. The couple resided at Verona, the Exum family's plantation on the banks of the Roanoke River. Matt and Martha produced at least eight children together: Matt W., Jr., Joseph E., George E., Esther, Patrick Exum, and Robert. A slaveholder, Matt W. Ransom also sired two children with Emma Outland, one of the women of African descent Ransom enslaved; Matt W. Ransom's children with the enslaved Emma Outland were Douglas Ransom (born 1859) and Alice Ransom (wife of Edward "Ned" Rawles, one of North Carolina's first African-American state legislators).

After serving as North Carolina Attorney General and as a member of the North Carolina General Assembly, Matt W. Ransom was chosen as one of the three commissioners from North Carolina to the Confederate government at Montgomery, Alabama, in 1861.

American Civil War
Ransom was commissioned lieutenant colonel of the 1st North Carolina Infantry Regiment and later colonel of the 35th North Carolina Infantry. This regiment was part of his brother Robert's brigade, which Matt later commanded. Ransom was promoted to brigadier general on June 13, 1863. Ransom saw action in the battles of Seven Pines, the Seven Days Battles, Antietam, Fredericksburg, Plymouth, Weldon, Suffolk and the siege of Petersburg. He was wounded three times during the Civil War and finally surrendered at Appomattox.

Later life
After the war, Ransom moved to Weldon, North Carolina, in 1866 where he was a planter and lawyer. In 1872, he was elected as a Democrat to the United States Senate to fill the vacancy in the term commencing March 4, 1871. Ransom was re-elected in 1876, 1883, and 1889 and served from January 30, 1872, to March 4, 1895. Ransom served briefly as President Pro tempore of the Senate during the 53rd Congress. He was later appointed United States Minister to Mexico and served from 1895 to 1897.

Following his term as ambassador, Ransom retired to his Verona, his estate, and engaged in agricultural pursuits. He died near Garysburg, North Carolina, on his 78th birthday, October 8, 1904. Ransom was buried on his estate, near Jackson, North Carolina. Verona was listed on the National Register of Historic Places in 1975.

See also
 List of American Civil War generals (Confederate)
 List of members of the United Confederate Veterans

Notes

References
 Eicher, John H., and David J. Eicher, Civil War High Commands. Stanford: Stanford University Press, 2001. .
 Sifakis, Stewart. Who Was Who in the Civil War. New York: Facts On File, 1988. .
 
 Warner, Ezra J. Generals in Gray: Lives of the Confederate Commanders. Baton Rouge: Louisiana State University Press, 1959. .

External links
  Retrieved on 2008-04-22
 

1826 births
1852 United States presidential electors
1904 deaths
19th-century American diplomats
Ambassadors of the United States to Mexico
Confederate States Army brigadier generals
Democratic Party United States senators from North Carolina
North Carolina Attorneys General
North Carolina Democrats
North Carolina lawyers
People from Warren County, North Carolina
People from Weldon, North Carolina
People from Northampton County, North Carolina
People of North Carolina in the American Civil War
Presidents pro tempore of the United States Senate
University of North Carolina at Chapel Hill alumni